St. Francis in Ecstasy is a painting of 1658–1660 by Francisco de Zurbarán in the Alte Pinakothek in Munich, where it has been since 1836. 

It is one of Zurbarán's several paintings of Francis of Assisi, his name saint. It was his second to last work on the subject; his last was St Francis Praying in his Cave (private collection).

When it was bought by Charles Theodore, Elector of Bavaria in 1756 for his gallery in Mannheim, the work was misattributed to Guido Reni. It was moved to the Hofgartengalerie in Munich in 1799 and its attribution was corrected in 1818 by Johann Georg von Dillis, director of Ludwig I of Bavaria's royal collection.

References

See also
 

1650s paintings
Paintings by Francisco de Zurbarán
Collection of the Alte Pinakothek
Zurbarán
Skulls in art